Justin Fletcher (born 30 March 1983) is a former professional ice hockey defenceman who last played for the Vienna Capitals of the Austrian Hockey League.

Career 
Fletcher previously played with Tohoku Free Blades in the Asia League Ice Hockey and the Augsburger Panther in the DEL. He has also played 179 regular-season games in the American Hockey League for the Springfield Falcons, Norfolk Admirals, Rockford IceHogs, and Peoria Rivermen. While with the Rivermen, Fletcher was signed to a NHL contract with affiliate, the St. Louis Blues.

Career statistics

References

External links

1983 births
Living people
American men's ice hockey defensemen
Augsburger Panther players
Ice hockey players from Illinois
Norfolk Admirals players
Peoria Rivermen (AHL) players
Rockford IceHogs (AHL) players
Sioux City Musketeers players
Springfield Falcons players
St. Cloud State Huskies men's ice hockey players
Tohoku Free Blades players
Vienna Capitals players
People from Maryville, Illinois